The 2012 Idol Star Olympics Championship (Hangul: 아이돌 스타 올림픽) was held at Mokdong Stadium in Seoul (on July 10, 2012) and Yong In University General Gymnasium in Yongin, South Korea and was broadcast on MBC from July 25 to 26, 2012. At the championships, a total number of 14 events (9 in athletics, 2 in archery, 2 in fencing and 1 in table tennis) were contested: 7 by men, 5 by women and 2 mixed. There were a total number of 150 participating K-pop singers and celebrities, divided into 9 teams.

Results

Men

Athletics

Fencing

Archery

Women

Athletics

Fencing

Archery

Mixed

Table Tennis

Special event for rookies

Ratings

References

External links
2012 Idol Star Olympics Championship official MBC website 

MBC TV original programming
South Korean variety television shows
South Korean game shows
2012 in South Korean television
Idol Star Athletics Championships